The OFC U-19 Championship is a tournament held once every two years to decide the under-19 champions of Oceania and also decides who will represent Oceania Football Confederation (OFC) at the biennial FIFA U-20 World Cup.

Between 1974 and 2012, the competition was open to teams under 20 years of age and called the OFC U-20 Championship. Since 2014, the age limit was darkreduced to under 19 years of age, and since 2018, the tournament name was changed to the OFC U-19 Championship.

Eligible teams
Fourteen nations are eligible to participate in the tournament, these are:

 (not a member of FIFA)

 (not a member of FIFA)

 (French Polynesia)

 (not a member of FIFA)

Former teams

 Israel (now is UEFA member)
 (now is AFC member)
 (now is AFC member)

Results

Summaries

U20 format

U19 format

Notes

Performances by team

* = As hosts

Notes

Participating nations
Legend

 – Champions
 – Runners-up
 – Third place
 – Fourth place
 – Semi-finals
5th–7th – Fifth to Seventh place
QF – Quarter-finals
GS – Group stage
PR – Preliminary round
q – Qualified
 — Hosts
 ••  – Qualified but withdrew
 ×  – Did not enter
 •  – Did not qualify
 ×  – Withdrew / Banned / Entry not accepted by FIFA
 — Country not affiliated to OFC at that time
 — Country did not exist or national team was inactive
     – Not affiliated to FIFA

FIFA U-20 World Cup performances
Legend
1st – Champions
2nd – Runners-up
3rd – Third place
4th – Fourth place
QF – Quarterfinals
R2 – Round 2
R1 – Round 1
     – Hosts
     – Not affiliated to OFC
Q – Qualified for upcoming tournament

References

External links
OFC Official Website
Results by RSSSF

 
Under-20 association football
Under20